The 1993 Afro-Asian Cup of Nations was the fifth edition of the Afro-Asian Cup of Nations, it was contested between Japan, winners of the 1992 Asian Cup, and Ivory Coast, winners of the 1992 Africa Cup of Nations. The match was played in one leg in Tokyo, Japan.

Qualified teams

Match details

Winners
Japan won 1–0 after extra time.

References

External links
1993 Afro-Asian Cup of Nations - rsssf.com

Afro-Asian Cup of Nations
Afro-Asian Cup of Nations
Mer
Mer
1993 in Japanese football
1993 in Ivorian football
Japan national football team matches
Ivory Coast national football team matches
International association football competitions hosted by Japan
October 1993 sports events in Asia